Udoka Timothy Azubuike (born September 17, 1999) is a Nigerian-American professional basketball player for the Utah Jazz of the National Basketball Association (NBA). He played college basketball for the Kansas Jayhawks.

Early life
Born in Lagos, Nigeria, Azubuike was the youngest of 3, with two older brothers and two older sisters. His father, Fabian, was a police officer, and his mother, Florence, was a middle school teacher. Azubuike lost his father to an undiagnosed disease at the age of 10. In 2012, he caught the attention of recruiters with Basketball Without Borders and was offered a scholarship to play basketball in the United States.

High school career
Azubuike attended Potter's House Christian Academy in Jacksonville, Florida. His then assistant coach Harry Coxsome and his wife Donna took care of him and soon became his legal guardians. In his first high school game he was matched up against fellow future Kansas Jayhawk Joel Embiid. Azubuike was a four-year starter averaging 16.9 points and 9.7 rebounds per game his senior year. 

He played Amateur Athletic Union (AAU) basketball for the Georgia Stars in the Nike Elite Youth Basketball League (EYBL).Azubuike was selected to play in the 2016 McDonald's All-American Boys Game, Jordan Brand Classic, and Nike Hoop Summit. He was also a member of the National Honor Society.

He was rated by Rivals.com as a five-star recruit and was ranked as the 27th best overall player while ESPN ranked him 22nd overall in the Class of 2016. Azubuike received offers from many universities including Duke, Texas, Kentucky, and shortened his final list of colleges to Florida State, Kansas, and North Carolina. On January 28, 2016, he announced his choice to play college basketball at the University of Kansas.

College career

Freshman year
In his freshman season he started in six of the 11 games he played in before tearing ligaments in his left wrist, which ended his season. Before the injury, he averaged 5.0 points, 4.4 rebounds, 1.6 blocks, and 62.9% field goal percentage.

Sophomore year
For the 2017–2018 season, Kansas' coach Bill Self recruited Kansas football player James Sosinski to defend Azubuike during practice. Udoka started every game of the regular season but missed the Big 12 tournament after spraining his left MCL. He returned for the NCAA tournament until KU's loss to eventual champion Villanova in the Final Four. He averaged 13.0 points, 7.0 rebounds, 1.7 blocks, and led the nation with a 77% field goal percentage for the season. His field goal percentage broke the single-season record for Kansas and the Big 12 Conference. This high percentage was in part due to the majority of his field goals being slam dunks, which typically have a higher completion percentage than jump shots or layups. He had more dunks than any other college player going back to the 2009–2010 season. He was awarded All-Big 12 third team by the conference's coaches and second team by the AP.

On April 20, 2018, Azubuike announced his intention to enter the 2018 NBA draft. He did not initially hire an agent, which would allow him to return before the combine. Azubuike was one of a record-high 69 prospects invited to the NBA Draft Combine that year. On May 17, he measured out to be a near 7' tall center (with shoes on) weighing in at 274 pounds and holding the second-longest wingspan at 7'7", behind only Mohamed Bamba. On May 30, 2018, he announced his intent to withdraw from the draft and return to Kansas for his junior season.

Junior year
Azubuike was selected as an honorable mention to the 2018–2019 All-Big 12 preseason team. On December 4, 2018, he severely sprained his right ankle against Wofford and missed the following four games. On January 5, 2019, Azubuike injured his wrist during practice. An MRI revealed he tore a ligament in his right hand. He underwent season-ending surgery on January 9, 2019.

Kansas won all nine games Azubuike played including against top ten teams Tennessee and Michigan State. He finished the season averaging 13.4 points and 6.8 rebounds.

On April 22, 2019, Azubuike announced he would return to Kansas for his senior season. According to KU coach Bill Self, “We’re all very excited about Udoka making the decision not to enter the [NBA] draft. Unfortunately for him, injury is the reason as he still cannot participate (at) what would be the NBA combine or workouts for the NBA teams."

Senior year
Azubuike scored a career-high 29 points in a 90–84 overtime win over Dayton on November 27, 2019. On February 22, 2020, Azubuike scored 23 points and had a career-high 19 rebounds in a 64–61 win over top-ranked Baylor.

At the conclusion of the regular season, Azubuike was named the Big 12 Player of the Year and NABC Defensive Player of the Year. Azubuike averaged 13.7 points, 10.5 rebounds, and 2.6 blocks per game as a senior. Azubuike's career field goal percentage of 74.9% is an NCAA record.

Professional career

Utah Jazz (2020–present)
Azubuike was selected with the 27th pick in the first round of the 2020 NBA draft by the Utah Jazz. On November 24, 2020, the Utah Jazz announced that they had signed Azubuike. Azubuike was assigned to the Jazz's NBA G League affiliate, the Salt Lake City Stars, for the start of the 2021 G League season, making his G League debut on February 10, 2021.

On March 25, 2022, Azubuike underwent right foot surgery and was ruled out for the rest of the 2021–22 season.

Career statistics

NBA

Regular season

|-
| style="text-align:left;"| 
| style="text-align:left;"| Utah
| 15 || 0 || 3.8 || .444 ||  || .800 || .9 || .0 || .1 || .3 || 1.1
|-
| style="text-align:left;"| 
| style="text-align:left;"| Utah
| 17 || 6 || 11.5 || .755 ||  || .545 || 4.2 || .0 || .1 || .6 || 4.7
|- class="sortbottom"
| style="text-align:center;" colspan="2"| Career
| 32 || 6 || 7.9 || .707 ||  || .667 || 2.6 || .0 || .1 || .5 || 3.0

Playoffs

|-
| style="text-align:left;"| 2021
| style="text-align:left;"| Utah
| 1 || 0 || 1.0 || – || – || – || 1.0 || .0 || .0 || .0 || .0
|- class="sortbottom"
| style="text-align:center;" colspan="2"| Career
| 1 || 0 || 1.0 || – || – || – || 1.0 || .0 || .0 || .0 || .0

College

|-
| style="text-align:left;"| 2016–17
| style="text-align:left;"| Kansas
|| 11 || 6 || 12.9 || .629 || – || .380|| 4.1|| .2 || .2 || 1.6 || 5.0
|-
| style="text-align:left;"| 2017–18 
| style="text-align:left;"| Kansas
|| 36 || 34 || 23.6 || style="background:#cfecec;"| .770* || – || .413|| 7.0 || .7 || .6 || 1.7 || 13.0
|-
| style="text-align:left;"| 2018–19 
| style="text-align:left;"| Kansas 
|| 9 || 9 || 20.4 || .705 || – || .344 || 6.8 || .6 || .4 || 1.6 || 13.4
|-
| style="text-align:left;"| 2019–20 
| style="text-align:left;"| Kansas 
|| 31 || 30 || 27.7 || style="background:#cfecec;"| .748* || – || .441 || 10.5 || .9 || .5 || 2.6 || 13.7
|- class="sortbottom"
| style="text-align:center;" colspan="2"| Career
|| 87 || 79 || 23.4 || .746 || – || .416 || 7.9 || .7 || .5 || 2.0 || 12.3

References

External links
Kansas Jayhawks bio

1999 births
Living people
All-American college men's basketball players
Basketball players from Jacksonville, Florida
Centers (basketball)
Kansas Jayhawks men's basketball players
Amateur Athletic Union men's basketball players
McDonald's High School All-Americans
Nigerian expatriate basketball people in the United States
Nigerian men's basketball players
Salt Lake City Stars players
Sportspeople from Lagos
Utah Jazz draft picks
Utah Jazz players